Cyriel Kolawole Dessers (born 8 December 1994) is a professional footballer who plays as a forward for  club Cremonese. Born in Belgium, he plays for the Nigeria national team.

Club career

OH Leuven 
During the 2013–14 season, 19-year-old Dessers stood out in the reserves and youth competitions for OH Leuven, scoring over 20 goals. With OHL in danger of relegation and several first team strikers either out of shape, injured or suspended, he was given his first minutes in the first team in a 3–2 away loss against Mons.

Lokeren and NAC Breda 
In April 2014, Dessers signed a two-year deal with Lokeren.

In July 2016, he signed with NAC Breda on a contract until summer 2019, of Dutch second-tier Eerste divisie. On 28 May 2017, they were promoted to the Eredivisie, after a 1–4 victory over NEC, in which Dessers scored three goals. He finished the season with 29 goals in 40 matches.

FC Utrecht 
In July 2017, Dessers moved to FC Utrecht, agreeing a contract for three years with an option for an additional year. On 11 August 2017, he scored the first goal in the competition.

After the 2019–20 Eredivisie season was abandoned, Dessers was jointly awarded the top goalscorer award alongside Steven Berghuis with 15 goals each.

Genk and loan to Feyenoord 
On 30 June 2020, Dessers moved to Genk on a four-year deal.

On 31 August 2021, Dessers returned to the Netherlands to join Feyenoord on loan with an option to buy. He scored his first goal for the club on 19 September, scoring Feyenoord's fourth goal in a 4–0 away win against PSV. On 1 June 2022, Feyenoord announced that they had opted not to exercise the option to purchase Dressers' contract.

Cremonese 
On 10 August 2022, Dessers signed with Cremonese in Italy.

International career
Born in Belgium to a Belgian father and Nigerian mother, Dessers chose to represent Nigeria at international level in December 2019.

On 4 March 2020, he was called up by Nigeria head coach Gernot Rohr as part of the team players invited for the Africa Cup of Nations qualifying fixtures against Sierra Leone. Dessers debuted in a friendly 1–1 draw with Tunisia on 13 October 2020.

Career statistics

Club

International

Scores and results list Nigeria's goal tally first, score column indicates score after each Dessers goal.

Honours
Genk
 Belgian Cup: 2020–21

Feyenoord
 UEFA Europa Conference League runner-up: 2021–22

Individual
 Eredivisie top scorer: 2019–20
 Eredivisie Player of the Month: November 2019
 UEFA Europa Conference League top scorer: 2021–22
 UEFA Europa Conference League Team of the Season: 2021–22

References

External links
 
 

1994 births
Living people
People from Tongeren
Footballers from Flemish Brabant
Nigerian people of Belgian descent
Belgian people of Nigerian descent
Belgian sportspeople of African descent
Black Belgian sportspeople
Sportspeople of Nigerian descent
Citizens of Nigeria through descent
Nigerian footballers
Belgian footballers
Association football forwards
Oud-Heverlee Leuven players
K.S.C. Lokeren Oost-Vlaanderen players
NAC Breda players
FC Utrecht players
Heracles Almelo players
K.R.C. Genk players
Feyenoord players
U.S. Cremonese players
Belgian Pro League players
Eerste Divisie players
Eredivisie players
Serie A players
Nigeria international footballers
Belgian expatriate footballers
Belgian expatriate sportspeople in the Netherlands
Belgian expatriate sportspeople in Italy
Nigerian expatriate footballers
Nigerian expatriate sportspeople in the Netherlands
Nigerian expatriate sportspeople in Italy
Expatriate footballers in the Netherlands
Expatriate footballers in Italy